The World Xiangqi Federation is the association of the national Xiangqi federations around the world, and has been a member of the International Mind Sports Association since 2015.
on April 6, 1993 on the occasion of the 3rd World Xiangqi Championship in Beijing, China had a ceremony to establish the World Xiangqi Federation after 4 years of preparations.

See also 
 International Mind Sports Association
 World Xiangqi Championship
 Xiangqi
 World Mind Games

References

External links
 World Xiangqi Federation

Xiangqi
International sports organizations